The Room is an album composed and performed by Harold Budd, released in 2000.

Production
Budd constructed The Room as a concept album about thematically different areas. Budd produced the album.

Critical reception
AllMusic wrote that "though some of the synthesizer textures verge on a little too much new age sweetness, [Budd's] piano is always a thing of tranquil beauty, veiled in layers of eerie echo, evoking a half-remembered dream." The Guardian wrote: "There was a time when every other musician with a synthesizer, a piano and a Portastudio was trying to make ambient statements like this, but the financial superstructure (not to mention the potential yuppie consumers) faded fast after Black Friday. Budd's choice of timbres and melodies, which manage to be pretty without insulting the intelligence, mean that the ambient legacy is in safe hands." CMJ New Music Monthly deemed the album "remarkably vibrant."

Track listing 
 "The Room of Ancillary Dreams" – 6:08
 "The Room of Oracles" – 4:46
 "The Room of Stairs" – 5:21
 "The Room of Corners" – 5:05
 "The Room Alight" – 4:41
 "The Candied Room" – 3:41
 "The Room of Mirrors" – 7:07
 "The Room Obscured" – 1:03
 "The Room of Forgotten Children" – 2:16
 "The Room of Accidental Geometry" – 3:25
 "The Room of Secondary Light" – 4:38
 "The Flowered Room" – 4:26
 "The Room" – 2:15

References 

Harold Budd albums
2000 albums
Atlantic Records albums
Ambient albums by American artists